The Foundation of Japanese Honorary Debts is an independent interest group in the Netherlands for those who incurred physical, mental or other damages inside and outside internment camps during the Japanese occupation of the Dutch East Indies (present-day Indonesia) during World War II.

The foundation was created on 4 April 1990 by former Burma Railway forced laborer Kees Stolk to demand recognition, apologies and final reparations from both Japan and the Netherlands. It received 76,000 damage claims. That same year, Japan rejected the claims on the basis of the 1951 Treaty of San Francisco and the 1956 Yoshida–Stikker Agreement between Japanese prime minister Shigeru Yoshida and Dutch foreign minister Dirk Stikker. According to the Japanese, the Dutch state bought off the rights of the victims, so any political and financial compensation had to be between the foundation and the Netherlands.

The Foundation of Japanese Honorary Debts also advocates for recognition of and reparations for Dutch comfort women.

The foundation organizes monthly demonstrations at the Embassy of Japan in The Hague.

See also 
 Japan–Netherlands relations
 Japanese occupation of the Dutch East Indies
 Japanese war crimes
 Comfort women

References

External links 
 

1990 establishments in the Netherlands
Comfort women
Japan–Netherlands relations
Japanese occupation of the Dutch East Indies
Japanese war crimes
Lobbying organizations in Europe
Transitional justice